Chaowang Road is a metro station of Line 3 of the Hangzhou Metro in China. It is located in Gongshu District of Hangzhou. The station was opened on 21 February 2022.Currently it serves as the western terminus of Line 3.

References 

Railway stations in Zhejiang
Railway stations in China opened in 2022
Hangzhou Metro stations